Henri Duvillard (born 23 December 1947) is a French former alpine ski racer.  He is one of just seven men to win World Cup races in every discipline contested at the time. Duvillard competed at the 1972 Olympics in the slalom, giant slalom and downhill events with the best result of fourth place in the slalom.

Career
Duvillard's World Cup career lasted from its inception in 1967 until 1973, during which time he won six races, including the prestigious Lauberhorn downhill in Wengen, Switzerland.  His best results came in 1971 and 1972, when he finished second in the overall standings, behind the legendary Gustav Thöni in consecutive seasons.

Troubles with the French national team leadership led him to retire from World Cup competition, and he moved on to the United States.  In November 1974, Duvillard joined the U.S. pro tour and finished second (to American Hank Kashiwa) for the 1975 season (Duvillard won more money, but Kashiwa won on points).  Duvillard dominated the tour in 1976, and became the pro champion at age 28. 

After retiring from competition, Duvillard launched an eponymous French skiwear label. His mother-in-law May Nilsson, father-in-law Maurice Lafforgue, wife Britt Lafforgue, elder brother Adrien Duvillard, nephew Adrien Duvillard and son-in-law Frédéric Covili are all Olympic alpine skiers.

World Cup victories
6 total wins (3 downhill, 2 giant slalom, 1 slalom)

References

External links
 
 
Sports Illustrated – The King of the Mountain – 12 April 1976

1947 births
Living people
Sportspeople from Haute-Savoie
French male alpine skiers
Olympic alpine skiers of France
Alpine skiers at the 1972 Winter Olympics